Welcome to Willits, also known as Alien Hunter, is a 2016 American science fiction comedy horror film directed by Trevor Ryan and starring Bill Sage, Sabina Gadecki, Anastasia Baranova, Dolph Lundgren, Thomas Dekker, Chris Zylka, Serge Levin, Garrett Clayton and Rory Culkin.

Plot
Deep in the Northern California woods, in the heart of the notorious Emerald Triangle, lies a remote cabin. Bill Sage is a marijuana farmer and methampetamne user/dealer in the area who  believes his farms have been invaded by aliens. Sage's paranoia continues to grow, which may be PTSD from an alien abudtion and torture. 

Residents of the area are suffering from attacks from mysterious creatures.

When Sage catches a wayward group of campers on his land, the situation quickly escalates into total carnage.

Cast

Bill Sage as Brock, a drug-addicted pot farmer who hallucinates campers into aliens but he allows to kill everybody
Chris Zylka as Jeremiah
Anastasia Baranova as Courtney
Sabina Gadecki as Peggy
Garrett Clayton as Zack
Rory Culkin as Possum
Thomas Dekker as Klaus
Dolph Lundgren as Officer Derek Hutchinson, a local officer of the police department
Serge Levin as Officer Jackson, Derek Hutchinson's partner

Production

Development
An  adaptation of the sci-fi/horror short "Welcome to Willits: After Sundown."

The first film made by the Ryans. Filmed in Louisiana, Los Angeles and Willits, California.

Reception

Critical response
The Los Angeles Times found the film promising with a loopy energy, but finally the movie was unfocused. The found the film promising enough to hope for more efforts from the filmmakers.

The Horror Society praised the film, finding it amazingly original. They praised the dialogue and the effects. , However, Rue Morgue preferred the short the film is based on. 

Dread Central praised the film, finding it one of the best independent horror films of the year.

References

External links
 
 

American slasher films
American science fiction horror films
American science fiction comedy films
American comedy horror films
2016 comedy films
2010s English-language films
2010s American films